Rochy may mean the following:

 Rochy (Polish settlement), a settlement in Poland
 Rochy Putiray, a retired football player from Indonesia
 Rochy-Condé, a small village in northern France
 Rochester, Pennsylvania, sometimes called Rochy